Joe Bottiglieri is an American football coach. He is the defensive coordinator at Alvernia University in Reading, Pennsylvania, a position he has held since spring  2022. Bottiglieri served as the head football coach at Mansfield University of Pennsylvania from 1978 to 1982 and Shippensburg University of Pennsylvania from 1986 to 1989. Bottiglieri was the defensive coordinator at Wesley University in Dover, Delaware from  2018 to 2020.

Head coaching record

College

References

Year of birth missing (living people)
Living people
Alvernia Golden Wolves football coaches
Lafayette Leopards football coaches
Lehigh Mountain Hawks football coaches
Mansfield Mounties football coaches
Rhode Island Rams football coaches
Shippensburg Red Raiders football coaches
Wesley Wolverines football coaches
William & Mary Tribe football coaches
High school football coaches in Pennsylvania
Bloomsburg University of Pennsylvania alumni
Indiana State University alumni
Sportspeople from Easton, Pennsylvania
Coaches of American football from Pennsylvania
Players of American football from Pennsylvania